Harold Saunders may refer to:
Harold Saunders (chess player) (1875–1950), British chess and bridge player
Harold E. Saunders (1890–1961), American hydrodynamicist
Harold H. Saunders (1930–2016), United States Assistant Secretary of State for Near East Affairs

See also
Harry Saunders (disambiguation)